The 2015 FIBA Europe Under-20 Championship for Women Division B was the 11th edition of the Division B of the Women's European basketball championship for national under-20 teams. It was held in Podgorica, Montenegro, from 2 to 12 July 2015. Bosnia and Herzegovina women's national under-20 basketball team won the tournament.

Participating teams

  (16th place, 2014 FIBA Europe Under-20 Championship for Women Division A)

  (15th place, 2014 FIBA Europe Under-20 Championship for Women Division A)

Final standings

Results

References

External links
FIBA official website

2015
2015–16 in European women's basketball
International youth basketball competitions hosted by Montenegro
FIBA U20
July 2015 sports events in Europe